Dvorský les (German: Hoflbusch) is a mountain in the Czech Republic. It is the highest peak of Rýchory ridge in Krkonoše mountain range.

Geography 
Dvorský les is the easternmost One-thousander of Krkonoše. It marks the eastern end of the main ridge of Rýchory. It is located approximately 3.5 km southwest from Žacléř, 10 km north from Trutnov and 6 km east from Janské Lázně. The mountain is located in the Krkonoše National Park.

References 

One-thousanders of the Czech Republic
Trutnov District